St. Mary's Cathedral (in ) is the seat of the Roman Catholic Archdiocese of Tokyo. It is located in the Sekiguchi neighborhood of Bunkyo, Tokyo, Japan.

History
The original wooden structure, constructed in 1899 in the Gothic style, was destroyed during the air raids on Tokyo during World War II. The present church, designed by Kenzo Tange, was inaugurated in December 1964. His funeral was held there in March 2005.

Architecture
The layout of the building is in the form of a cross, from which eight hyperbolic parabolas open upwards to form a cross of light, which continues vertically along the length of the four facades. This Tange design inspired the later similar design of the landmark cathedral in San Francisco, also referred to as St. Mary's Cathedral.

To this rhomboid volume other secondary constructions are added, including the baptistry and the baptismal font. The rectangular shapes contrast with the symbolic character of the cathedral. The exterior cladding is made of stainless steel.
In 2004 a large organ built by Italian firm Mascioni was installed.

Gallery

References

External links

 
 Photographs of exterior and interior of church

Churches in Tokyo
Mary, Tokyo
Roman Catholic churches completed in 1964
Buildings and structures in Bunkyō
Modernist architecture in Japan
Religious organizations established in 1899
Kenzo Tange buildings
20th-century Roman Catholic church buildings in Japan